Zachariah was a Khagan of the Khazars, reported in the account of St. Cyril. The dates of his reign are unknown but he was khagan during Cyril's visit to Khazaria in 861.

9th-century Turkic people
Khazar rulers
9th-century rulers in Europe
Jewish royalty